Natalia Evangelidou (born 10 March 1991) is a Cypriot middle-distance runner competing primarily in the 800 metres. She represented her country at the 2014 Commonwealth Games without qualifying from the heats. In addition, she won several medals at the Games of the Small States of Europe.

Competition record

Personal bests
Outdoor
800 metres – 2:01.77 (Gold Coast 2018) NR
1500 metres – 4:10.98 (Gold Coast 2018) NR

Indoor
800 metres – 2:06.52 (Beograd 2017)  NR
1500 metres – 4:14.62 (Athlone 2018) NR
3000 metres – 10:06.41 (Piraeus 2018)

References

1994 births
Living people
Cypriot female middle-distance runners
Cypriot female athletes
Commonwealth Games competitors for Cyprus
Athletes (track and field) at the 2014 Commonwealth Games
Athletes (track and field) at the 2018 Commonwealth Games
Athletes (track and field) at the 2018 Mediterranean Games
Sportspeople from Nicosia
Competitors at the 2015 Summer Universiade
Competitors at the 2017 Summer Universiade
Mediterranean Games competitors for Cyprus
20th-century Cypriot women
21st-century Cypriot women